A Cherry Cherry Christmas is the third Christmas album and also the twenty-eighth studio album by singer-songwriter Neil Diamond. The album contains five new tracks, and nine tracks compiled from his previous two Christmas albums.  It was released on October 13, 2009. The title track is a new Christmas carol written by Diamond.

The album includes a cover of Adam Sandler's "The Chanukah Song", which Diamond recorded because, he explained, "There are so many beautiful Christmas songs around and so few Hanukkah songs."

Track listing

Personnel 
 Neil Diamond – vocals

Promotion 
A music video ecard was also released for the song "The Chanukah Song".

References

External links 
 Review on PRNewsWire.com
 Review on Spinner.com

Neil Diamond albums
2009 Christmas albums
Christmas albums by American artists
Pop rock Christmas albums